The 1972 Rutgers Scarlet Knights football team represented Rutgers University in the 1972 NCAA University Division football season. In their 13th and final season under head coach John F. Bateman, the Scarlet Knights compiled a 7–4 record. The team outscored its opponents 290 to 171. The team's statistical leaders included Leo Gasienica with 1,409 passing yards, J. J. Jennings with 1,262 rushing yards, and Tom Sweeney with 369 receiving yards.

The Scarlet Knights played their home games at Rutgers Stadium in Piscataway, New Jersey, across the river from the university's main campus in New Brunswick.

Schedule

Roster

References

Rutgers
Rutgers Scarlet Knights football seasons
Rutgers Scarlet Knights football